Ribeiria is a genus of rostroconch mollusc with a pegma, once interpreted as an intermediate between helcionellids (such as Anabarella and Latouchella) and primitive scaphopods (such as Pinnocaris).

References

Prehistoric mollusc genera
Fossils of the Czech Republic
Letná Formation
Paleozoic life of Ontario
Paleozoic life of Alberta
Paleozoic life of Quebec